Ilfracombe is a seaside resort and civil parish on the North Devon coast, England, with a small harbour surrounded by cliffs.

The parish stretches along the coast from the 'Coastguard Cottages' in Hele Bay toward the east and  along the Torrs to Lee Bay toward the west.

The landmark of Hillsborough Hill dominates the harbour and the site of an Iron Age fortified settlement. In the built environment, the architectural-award-winning Landmark Theatre is either loved or hated for its unusual double-conical design. The 13th century parish church, Holy Trinity, and the St Nicholas's Chapel (a lighthouse) on Lantern Hill, have been joined by Damien Hirst's statue of Verity as points of interest.

History 

Ilfracombe has been settled since the Iron Age, when the Dumnonii (the Roman name for the inhabitants of the South-West) established a hill fort on the dominant hill, Hillsborough (formerly Hele's Barrow). The origin of the town's name has two possible sources. The first is that it is a derivative of the Anglo-Saxon Alfreinscoma - by which name it was noted in the Liber Exoniensis of 1086. The translation of this name (from Walter William Skeat of the department of Anglo Saxon at Cambridge University) means the "Valley of the sons of Alfred". The second origin is that the name Ilfracombe was derived from Norse illf (bad), Anglo-Saxon yfel (evil ford) and Anglo-Saxon cumb (valley) perhaps from a Celtic source (compare Welsh cwm), thus 'The valley with the bad ford'.

The manor house at Chambercombe in east Ilfracombe was recorded in the 1086 Domesday Book as being built by a Norman knight Champernon (from Chambernon in France) who landed with William of Normandy. It is also said to be haunted.

Ilfracombe comprised two distinct communities; a farming community around the parish church called Holy Trinity, parts of which date from the 12th century, and a fishing community around the natural harbour formed between Capstone, Compass and Lantern Torrs. It is recorded that the lands by the church were part of the estate owned by Champernowne family, while those by the harbour belonged to the Bouchier family: Earls of Bath.

Because of the natural layout of the harbour, Ilfracombe became a significant safe port (registered port of refuge) on the Bristol Channel. It also had trade routes between Kinsale and Tenby, which made the port stronger. In 1208 it was listed as having provided King John with ships and men to invade Ireland; in 1247 it supplied a ship to the fleet that was sent to conquer the Western Isles of Scotland; 6 ships, with 79 men were sent to support the siege of Calais. Ilfracombe was the last disembarkation point for two large forces sent to subdue the Irish. The building which sits on Lantern Hill by the harbour, known as St Nicholas's Chapel (built 1361) is reputed to be the oldest working lighthouse in the UK; a light/beacon has been there for over 650 years.

The town was also home to the Bowen family. James Bowen was commissioned by Howe for his leadership in the battle. For his skill in saving the Peninsula army from Napoleon's forces, he was presented to a joint meeting of the Upper and Lower Houses of Parliament to receive the rare honour of record of "grateful thanks of the nation". He retired as a Rear Admiral and Commissioner of the Royal Navy. John Bowen (1780–1827), son of Admiral James Bowen, was a naval officer and colonial administrator. He founded the first settlement of Tasmania at Risdon Cove in 1803 - the settlement that later became known as Hobart. Captain John Bowen married Queen Charlotte's niece.

Lieutenant A E Down was initially posted to Ilfracombe to lead a protection ship for HM Customs and Excise. He married a local girl and rose through the officers’ ranks to retire as Vice Admiral. His son joined the navy aged 14 (his first navy kit is on display at National Maritime Museum, Greenwich). In 1802 James Meek married Down's daughter and settled in the town; James Meek was appointed the Comptroller of Victuals to the Royal Navy in 1832. He was knighted and died in Ilfracombe in 1852. (Gentlemen's Gazette)

There was a wooden fortress overlooking the harbour; of this nothing remains except contemporary records and the area designated Castle Hill off Portland Street/Montepellier Terrace.

The novelist Frances Burney stayed in Ilfracombe in 1817. Her diary entries (2 July – 5 October) record early 19th-century life in Ilfracombe: a captured Spanish ship; two ships in distress in a storm; the visit of Thomas Bowdler; and her lucky escape after being cut off by the tide. A few years later in the 1820s, a set of four tunnels were hand-carved by Welsh miners to permit access to the beaches by horse-drawn carriage as well as by foot. Previously access was gained by climbing the cliffs, rounding the point by boat, swimming or at the lowest tides clambering around the rocks of the point. These tunnels led to a pair of tidal pools, which in accordance with Victorian morals, were used for segregated male and female bathing. Whereas women were constrained to a strict dress code covering up the whole body, men generally swam naked. The tunnels are still viewable and are signposted as Tunnels Beaches.

In 1856, writer Mary Ann Evans (pen-name George Eliot) accompanied George Henry Lewes to Ilfracombe to gather materials for his work Seaside Studies published in 1858. In more recent times, actor Peter Sellers lived in the town when his parents managed the Gaiety Theatre; he first stepped on the stage there and reputedly played the drums. Another actor, Terry Thomas visited the town frequently to stay with his sister, and in the same period, Joan Collins and Jackie Collins were schooled here and boarded in the town. In the last two decades, the town has been home to many artists including locally Damien Hirst, and George Shaw a runner up for the Turner Prize. There is an annual art festival when local artists open their homes for visitors to see their work and 7 to 10 permanent art galleries.
the town's first lifeboat was bought in 1828 but a permanent service was not available until the Royal National Lifeboat Institution built a lifeboat station at the bottom of Lantern Hill near the pier in 1866. The present station at Broad Street dates from 1996.

In 1911, the Irish nationalist Anna Catherine Parnell (sister of Charles Stewart Parnell) drowned at Ilfracombe and is buried in the churchyard at Holy Trinity.

Alice Frances Louisa Phillips (b. 26 January 1891 at 85 High Street, Ilfracombe) and her father Escott Robert Phillips (b. 1869 Cardiff) held 2nd class ticket No. 2 on the Titanic, and set sail from Southampton on 10 April 1912 heading for New Brighton, Pennsylvania. Alice was rescued in boat 12, but her father was lost in the disaster.

Governance 

The town lies within the Parliamentary constituency of North Devon. It had Liberal Democrat representation from 1992 to 2015 with MP Nick Harvey. Since 2015 it has been a Conservative seat, first represented by Peter Heaton-Jones from 2015 to 2019, and since 2019 by Selaine Saxby.

There are three electoral wards named Ilfracombe (Central, East & West). The ward strays outside the town boundaries a little and the total 2011 census figure is 11,509.

The three councils which govern activities in the town are Devon County Council, North Devon District Council, and Ilfracombe Town Council. The councils cover different areas of responsibility:

Roads, Education, Economic Affairs, Youth Services and Social Services are covered by Devon County Council based in County Hall, Exeter to which Ilfracombe sends one elected member.
Housing, Refuse Collection, Street Cleaning, Parks & Gardens, Harbour, Leisure & Culture, Licensing and Planning are covered by North Devon District Council, Barnstaple to which Ilfracombe elects five members (two each from West and Central Wards and one from East Ward). North Devon District Council has area offices in the Ilfracombe Centre on High Street.
The Town Council, which has 3 wards and 18 members (7 from West and Central Wards and 4 from the East Ward) acts as the watchdog to the other two councils whilst also developing local initiatives owning and managing the Ilfracombe Centre and supporting many community associations and activities. Following the success of the town council's development of the Ilfracombe Centre, the council has in 2010 developed and published a comprehensive review of the town development strategy outlined in the Strategic Action Plan created by the Ilfracombe Community Alliance. The town council's new document, available on the council's website, gives the framework within which it will lead the future regeneration of the community through to 2025.

The town is also twinned with Herxheim in Germany and Ifs in France.

Geography 

Ilfracombe overlies slates formed from sedimentary rock that underwent geological stress (creating faults and folds), towards the end of the Carboniferous Period, around 300 million years ago. These are known as the Ilfracombe slates.
Ilfracombe lies within the North Devon Areas of Outstanding Natural Beauty which is renowned for its dramatic coastal cliffs and landscape. Hillsborough, lying close to the town centre is a local nature reserve, and around the town are many other havens for wildlife, notable including the Cairn. The coast itself is part of the North Devon Voluntary Marine Conservation area because of its diverse and rare species.

Demography 

During the boom times of tourism in the 1950s, there was not a large enough local workforce to serve the needs of the tourism industry during the summer months. Many local businesses advertised in Northern cities such Manchester and Liverpool to alleviate this problem. This 'inward migration' caused social problems and friction between these people and those with a long history of residence. At its peak over 10,000 holidaymakers used the railway each Saturday during peak season, and passenger ferries brought still more. When the tourism market faltered with the arrival of cheap foreign package holidays in the 1960s, and the closure of the railway, unemployment levels rose. In 2001, Ilfracombe Central Ward was designated the most deprived super output area in Devon.

These problems are now being addressed by the implementation of local government schemes such as the Mystart (formerly Sure Start) project to help support families with young children, and, since 2004, the Neighbourhood Management Transform programme. Both of these were the first such government-sponsored social development schemes covering rural areas in England. Better policing, the use of neighbourhood wardens and CCTV have led to a reduction in crime rates recorded by the police on the police and crime website  to levels closer to the North Devon average (a fraction of those nationally).

More recently, a 2009 Mosaic study found that all areas of the town are largely populated with close-knit manufacturing town communities, while the surrounding parishes are predominantly populated by people living far from urbanisation. The study also found that south of the town centre is a large contingent of upwardly mobile families living in homes bought from social landlords, while in the south-west of the town, many low-income families live in estate-based social housing.

Economy 

Until the mid-19th century Ilfracombe's economy was based around maritime activities: importing lime and coal from Wales; fishing for herring; and international trade, including to West Africa and the West Indies. In George III and the Regency period the town, population then 1800, was home to many navy personnel – four admirals, numerous captains, and other commissioned and non-commissioned sailors.

The town gradually developed into a tourist resort served by ferries along the Bristol Channel. The opening of the railway accelerated this development. The population grew until the First World War, then stabilised at 9,200, now 11,000. The economy suffered throughout the 1960s as UK holiday patterns changed, and suffered further through the closure of the railway line in 1970.

In the last 25 years, major investment by private 'light engineering' companies has added to the economy. These companies include: Pall Europe - a filtration manufacturer, the European headquarters TDK-Lambda, a subsidiary of the TDK Corporation, which manufactures industrial & medical power supplies. A number of light engineering firms provide additional employment and operate within a couple of miles of the town centre at Mullacott Cross. There are 3 deep-sea fishing boats which sail from the port and several inshore boats which farm the local lobster, crabs and whelks. In a survey (2011) for the EU funded Flag programme it was reported 90% of the local maritime catch is exported to France and Spain. There are many private charters, sea cruise and coastal tour boat operators sailing from the harbour.

Employment Research conducted by MORI in 2005 for the Transform (UK government neighbourhood management project), and by Roger Tym & Partners for the Ilfracombe Community Alliance showed:-The service sector (includes hotel and catering) at 76% is 2 x higher than the North Devon (40.1%) or Devon average (33.7%). 51% of businesses by number are within the distribution, hotels and restaurants sector.12.8% are within the banking, finance and insurance sector.11.9% are within public administration, health and education.

Transport

Road 

Ilfracombe is at the southern end of the A361, the longest 3-digit A-road in England which finishes on the A5 at Kilsby on the Northamptonshire-Warwickshire border near Rugby and is the town's main connection with the South West England motorway, the M5.

Bus and railway 
From 1874, Ilfracombe was served by the Ilfracombe railway line that ran from Barnstaple, but this closed in 1970. Now, the nearest National Rail railway station is in Barnstaple and buses provide the public transport link from there to Ilfracombe. There are a number of regular bus services operating from Ilfracombe. These include:
 Stagecoach 21/21A: Ilfracombe - Braunton - Barnstaple - Fremington - Bideford - Westward Ho!
 Filers Travel 31: Ilfracombe - Woolacombe - Morthoe 
 Filers Travel 301: Barnstaple - North Devon Hospital - Ilfracombe - Combe Martin

Service 31 will be operated by Taw and Torridge from 1 June 2021.

There are also several smaller routes around the town run by the local operator Independent Coach Company.

Ferry 

The first steam packets arrived at Ilfracombe in 1823, and soon a regular service between Bristol and between Swansea developed.
On 16 May 1873, a wooden promenade pier was opened to allow the pleasure steamers to berth at all tides. On 23 June 1894, it was reported in the Ilfracombe Chronicle that over 2,500 people arrived in no less than seven boats, it describes them as 'commodious and well-appointed vessels with an excellent reputation for speed and comfort.'  As well as holidaymakers, the boats carried workers, live and dead stock and other merchandise to and from the town.
The  arrived in Ilfracombe in 1887, after her owners P & A Campbell brought her to Bristol, initially on a charter, as their first pleasure steamer to work the Bristol Channel, and was based there until 1917. Deterioration of the wooden pier and part demolition during the Second World War mean that a new pier was required. The wood was replaced with reinforced concrete and car parking space was increased. The new pier was opened on 6 July 1952.

A seasonal passenger ferry, operated by MS Oldenburg, connects the harbour to Lundy Island. Pleasure boats, including MV Balmoral and PS Waverley, operate seasonal cruises from Ilfracombe, including crossings to Porthcawl. However, due to rising fuel costs these services are under threat.
A catamaran-based ferry service from Ilfracombe to Swansea was developed, however this service did not commence, reportedly because adequate landing and berthing facilities in Swansea have not been forthcoming. It has been raised again as a possibility as part of the Greening of the UK infrastructure.

Education 

The town's educational needs are served by three schools: an infants school, a junior school and the Ilfracombe Academy. Each of these schools are amongst the largest of their type in Devon. The Ilfracombe Academy serves the needs of Ilfracombe residents and those across the coastal North Devon area as far as Lynton and Lynmouth on the Somerset county border. It is a nationally recognised centre for Media Studies and was in 2004 awarded Media Arts Status. Upon completion of a new art block in 2007, the school's specialist status became simply arts. Further educational courses and vocational courses are run by the school. The school has recently had a major rebuilding.

Ilfracombe Museum was opened in 1932 in Ilfracombe Hotel's Victorian laundry and contains attractions from around the world including pickled bats and the two-headed kitten. It also contains items and photographs of local railway interest including one of the concrete name boards from the now closed local railway station, which can be seen on the front wall of the museum; and a collection of pieces of Victorian wedding cakes. It also has oak panels salvaged from the wreck of HMS Montagu.

Ilfracombe also has a library located on the Residential Candar Retirement Development.

Landmarks 
Ilfracombe has a wide variety of architectural styles dating from the 13th Century to 21st Century. The town has ancient streets leading to the harbour; on higher ground there are Georgian and Regency period terraces and mansions. Naturally, the period from 1830 to 1900 was a time of great development and has been the subject of several books by J Bates the architecture of Ilfracombe which gives the town a Victorian flavour visible in many buildings. The latest style of architecture can be seen in the award-winning design of the Landmark theatre and the McCarthy Stone apartment block Lantern Court which stands above the harbour.

Religious sites 

Ilfracombe has Christian churches of various denominations. The main Anglican church is the parish church, Holy Trinity, which is the mother church to St Peter's on Highfield Road. Several other churches identify themselves as Evangelical, but differ in denominational background. These include: St Philip and St James Church whose background is Anglican; three free churches - Brookdale Evangelical Church and Ilfracombe Christian Fellowship Church, of which the latter is the more charismatic and Ilfracombe Baptist Church of the Baptist tradition on the High Street. There is also the Roman Catholic Our Lady Star of the Sea Church in Runnacleave Road, the Methodist/United Reformed Emmanuel Church on Wilder Road, and the Salvation Army Corps church on Torrs Park, by Bath Place. There is a Jehovah's Witness meeting place in Victoria Road.

Lighthouse 

Since at least the mid-17th century a light has been displayed from the 14th-century chapel atop Lantern Hill, to guide ships entering the harbour. The light remains operational, and is said to be Britain's oldest lighthouse. The current lantern was installed by Trinity House in 1819; the date is shown on a fish-shaped weather vane. The light was owned and overseen by the Lord of the Manor of Ilfracombe; in the mid-19th century it was gas-powered (it used three gas burners with silvered reflectors) and displayed a fixed red light. The light is presently operated by the harbour authority and the Grade I listed building is owned by the North Devon Council. Regular worship in the chapel ceased at the Reformation, and for a time the building served as a cottage for lighthouse keepers before falling into some dilapidation. It was restored in 1962, however, by the local Rotary Club, under whose auspices the chapel is open to visitors in the summer months.

Sports and leisure activities 

Ilfracombe Rugby Union Club was founded in 1877 and welcomes players from 16 to 61.

Ilfracombe Golf Club (located just beyond Hele Bay) was founded in 1892.

The cricket club, formed in 1923, play at Killacleave Playing Fields.

Ilfracombe Running Club was formed in October 2013 and is affiliated to England Athletics. They meet at Ilfracombe Town F.C. at 7:00 pm on Thursday evenings.

Ilfracombe Town Football Club, who play at Marlborough Park near Ilfracombe Arts College, compete in the Premier Division of the North Devon Football League after the 1st team who before competed in the Western League but then withdrew following a committee vote. The club has 2 men's teams, a ladies' team and 3 youth teams.

There is a high street indoor gym and an outdoor work out facility on Oxford Park. The rural and hilly nature of the local terrain provide plenty of opportunities to exercise outside.

A tennis club is based at Bicclescombe Park which contains several tennis courts, bookable for a small fee by both tourists and locals.

The local swimming pool supports many activities - leisure swimming, competitive swimming and life saving classes for all age groups. It is the centre for large swimming club and separate still water life saving clubs, all of whom annually enter national competitions.

The flat green bowling enthusiasts have a centre at the Ilfracombe Bowling Club on Highfield Road.

In Fore Street, there is a nationally affiliated table tennis centre with teams ranging in age from juniors to veterans. There are starter sessions held weekly besides main league competitions

Maritime activities include a popular yacht club and a rapidly growing Gig boat club with three boats which now competes in the world championships. Most Mondays and Thursdays the local Ilfracombe Sea Cadets meet near the harbour, in what was the old rope making factory on Ropery Road. There is also a kayak and canoeing club and a large sub-aqua club.

Other sports teams in the town include Hash Harriers Running Club and many skittles and darts teams operated by the numerous licensed premises in the town. A local Euchre league is active during the winter, as well as many quiz leagues.

In 2008, the town council-owned Slade Community Centre, operated by an independent community group, which was renamed the "Vision".  It is home to an Aikido club and a kick boxing club as well as numerous activities for younger children. A boxing club is held twice weekly in the local fire station. There are active modern and traditional dance clubs, including Morris Dancing.

There is a large sea fishing fraternity, both off shore using owned or hired boats, and shore casting from various beaches and "hot" spots.

Numerous groups of volunteer-led gardening and horticultural enthusiasts work together under the "Greener Ilfracombe" banner. Ilracombe in Bloom committee have successfully led the town in national and regional competition for decades; since 2000, 3 community gardens have been opened on underused or derelict land. These are Cow Green, a recreational garden, and Calf Laston Greens (small starter allotments) and an Incredible Edible Project with a waste not cafe. Trans-send and Devon Community Resource Cic (which operates the community apple orchard at Hele) are also affiliated. A new group to support English Heritage investigation into the historic importance of Hillsborough Iron Age settlement has been formed. There is a thriving Cemetery group the volunteers have rejuvenated the ancient graveyard around Trinity Church. and regularly organise "Dead Famous" in Ilfracombe walks and talks giving the background to the residents buried in the grounds.

Despite the hilly terrain, Ilfracombe is at the northern end of National Cycle Network route 27, known as the Devon Coast to Coast Cycle Route, which starts from the pier (clock-in station at the Pier Tavern) and ends in Plymouth. There is another coastal trail suitable for cycling which starts at the pier which heads eastwards towards Minehead (defined as 'arduous'). A new event in 2010, organised by North Devon Wheelers is a giro cycle race round the town held as a prologue to the annual carnival. In September 2011 the first Ilfracombe triathlon was held on "the mother of all short courses" 400m sea swim, 22 km cycle, 5 km run.

The South West Coast Path connecting Minehead in Somerset to Dorset, via Land's End, passes through the town from Hele Bay to Lee Bay via Ilfracombe Harbour.

The first person to swim the 30½ nautical miles (56.5 km; 35.1 mi) from Ilfracombe to Swansea was Gethin Jones, who achieved the record on 13 September 2009, taking nearly 22 hours. In 2016 Sian Clement became the first female and achieved a new fastest crossing at 14 hours 1 minute.

Development 

From 2001 there was an economic regeneration programme led by the Ilfracombe & District Community Alliance MCTI, a community interest company designed to encourage social entrepreneurship. After widespread community consultation this programme developed a community economic strategy for the next twenty years published in 2005.
The town council working with and North Devon District Council is formulating plans for the town's economic and physical structures. Proposed developments are: the enhancement of the harbour area; A large extension (500 dwellings) to the town on high ground to the south. There is long-term development of the derelict bus station site based on plans developed by Terence O'Rourke; and the creation of better youth support and recreation facilities at the Larkstone eastern side of the harbour area.

The town council - working with GOSW, SWRDA and NDDC, supported by the Alliance and Transform - developed the council offices into a community training resource in the town centre: 'The Ilfracombe Centre'. In 2006, major leisure industry developments by John Fowler, a local holiday camp operator, are expected to help shift the local economy back to tourism. This combined with investment by patrons such as Damien Hirst (who with his partner Mia recently funded a restaurant owned by Simon Brown, No 11 The Quay, on Harbour Quay Road, is developing a boutique guest house on the Torrs, as well owning other properties within the town) and the introduction of high quality accommodation should make Ilfracombe a more attractive destination for food lovers and tourists.

Ilfracombe Town Council in partnership with North Devon District Council made a successful bid under the coalition's "Localism" agenda to operate a pilot Community Budget scheme. The work to develop this scheme has been a major development to the community.

Culture 

Each year, the residents and schoolchildren of Ilfracombe celebrate their heritage. These celebrations include six carnivals – a May Day, led by a "green" man walking celebration, it is a successor to the May Day events held for centuries until suppressed by the church in the 19th century because of riotous, licentious and drunken behaviour; Ilfracombe Victorian Celebration, a week-long programme of events held annually in June to celebrate a time of the town's prosperity; a large street carnival procession during August, organised by Ilfracombe Lions; the "sea ilfracombe" festival in September and the Lighting of the Lights held during November; and at Christmas, a Christingle.

A farmers' market is held regularly in the Lantern Community Centre on High Street. By the Landmark Theatre there is a small museum, housed in the buildings of the laundry of the former Ilfracombe Hotel. For those of literary intent there is an Ilfracombe authors'/writers' group.

The town hosts 10 small art galleries, including the exhibitions displayed by the Art Society in their gallery in the Arcade on the seafront, the foyer of the Landmark Theatre, the Quay and in "Number Eleven, The Quay" within which there are many Damien Hirst works, including butterflies, pharmacy, small statues and wallpaper designs. In October 2012 Damien Hirst loaned the statue, Verity, to the District Council, it is a controversial piece but stands guiding mariners into the safety of the harbour. The town is home to many artists who work with Damien Hirst (winner Turner Prize for contemporary art 1996), of significance the 2011 shortlisted Turner Prize artist, George Shaw, has a studio and now lives in the town.

Two other charitable events are organised each summer by Ilfracombe Round Table. Both make use of Ilfracombe Pier as a display area. The first of these is the annual "South West Birdman" contest which involves entrants seeking to 'fly' from the pier in home-made flying machines. The second event is "Rescue Day", an opportunity for members of the public to learn about the activities of the emergency services. The highlight of the day is a simulated air-sea rescue involving the launch of the Ilfracombe RNLI lifeboat, a Sea King helicopter from RAF 22 Squadron, Exmoor Search and Rescue team and local Fire, Ambulance and HM Coastguard services.

Performing arts 
Small Pond Productions is the main theatrical group in Ilfracombe, since its inception in 2002. It produces musicals, concerts and plays throughout the year. In 2007 the group created and performed the first stage production of the Vicar of Dibley by arrangement with Richard Curtis and Tiger Aspect productions. Most recently they have produced large scale musicals at the town's Landmark Theatre. Ilfracombe Musical Productions hold a long-standing Variety show every year at the Landmark, during The Victorian Week Celebration, in aid of Local Good Causes and have raised over £80,000 from these events. Studio Theatre is a community theatre group, established in 1984, which stage a wide variety of Drama ranging from the classics, to experimental plays throughout the year at venues in Ilfracombe and throughout North Devon. Studio Theatre staged its 100th production, The Heiress, in May 2008. These three main theatrical companies are affiliated to 'The Space', which is a multifunctional community building which host community and theatrical events.

Other 

During the early 1990s, the team of the popular English reality TV show Challenge Anneka relocated the redundant old wooden library from the Hermitage site, to "Burnside" in the heart of the Slade Valley estate for use as a community-owned centre.

Ilfracombe's fires 
The Great Fire of Ilfracombe started at 12:40 a.m. on the night of 28 July 1896 in the basement of Mr William Cole's ironmongers and furniture shop on the corner of Portland Street and Fore Street. The local volunteer fire brigade had it under control by the following morning. The fire brigade's entire equipment was a manual Merryweather engine, a hose-reel cart and one telescopic ladder on wheels. In total thirty five houses and business premises and their contents were destroyed. Later that year the fire brigade crew were presented with medals and £2 each at a dinner in their honour at the Royal Clarence Hotel. The damage was estimated at the times at between £80,000 and £100,000.

The same area of the town was struck by fire twice during the 1980s. First on 12 December 1981 Draper's paint store in the upper story of the building on the corner of Portland Street and Fore Street, this fire was contained quickly, however fumes from the burning paint meant much of the local area was evacuated during the night. The second much larger fire started at 2:30 am on the night of 2 September 1983 in the shopping arcade under the Candar Hotel. In this fire one life was lost. Both of these fires drew parallels to the Great Fire in the media of the time. The Candar Arcade site became the Candar sheltered residential apartments (the opening of Candar apartments was the last public engagement performed by Charles and Diana, as the Prince and Princess of Wales in 1992.

Other fires in Ilfracombe include: On 17 May 1985 the Beacon Castle was devastated by fire. On 5 August 1991 the Mount Hotel was destroyed by fire. On 24 January 2001 the Hotel Cecil; 14 January 2004 the arcade on the seafront near Susan Day Residential Home was destroyed by fire. On 17 November 2004 and 13 February 2005 the Cliffe Hydro suffered from fires.

Shortly before 7:00 BST on Wednesday, 8 August 2006, a fire broke out at the derelict Montebello Hotel in Fore Street, Ilfracombe. Twenty fire engines were required to put out the blaze including a number rushed to the scene from Woolacombe, Barnstaple and the bordering county of Somerset. Specialist equipment was brought in from as far afield as Exeter, and according to the local radio news 85 firemen were involved at the fire. The fire spread to three neighbouring properties and showered debris over a wide area. The six-storey hotel was completely gutted, with only the front wall, chimney stacks and remains of the lift shaft frame surviving the blaze, and the fire was still being damped-down the following day. Fore Street was closed for some period due to the difficulties of demolition.

The building was eventually demolished when it was determined that the fire had left it structurally unsound. This caused additional headaches for the emergency services as curious members of the public ignored safety barriers in an attempt to see the remains more clearly. The site is to be redeveloped as residential accommodation, although, as of November 2013, no work has been started on the site.

This history of Ilfracombe's large fires has to be taken in the context of the number, size and antiquity of many early Victorian jerry built hotels. A comprehensive display in the museum shows whilst the size of buildings may be large, the frequency of such conflagrations is comparatively low and the justification as to why Devon and Somerset fire and rescue authority transferred the large extension ladder from the Ilfracombe station to Barnstaple.

See also 
 Ilfracombe Cemetery
 Ilfracombe Branch Line
 List of people from Ilfracombe
 History of Ilfracombe

References

External links 

 Ilfracombe Town Council
 
 Ilfracombe Devon Town mosaic profile 

 
Seaside resorts in England
Towns in Devon
Ports and harbours of Devon
Ports and harbours of the Bristol Channel
Populated coastal places in Devon